Jacques Judah Lyons (August 25, 1814 - August 12, 1877) was a Surinamese-born American rabbi. He was a co-founder of the  Mount Sinai Hospital.

Biography
Lyons was a son of Judah and Mary Lyons, and born in Surinam on August 25, 1814. He received his education in Suriname, and was rabbi of the Spanish and Portuguese congregation there, Neveh Shalom, for five years. He left Surinam in 1837 and went to Richmond, Virginia, where for two years he was rabbi of the Congregation Beth Schalom. In 1839 he was elected rabbi of the Spanish and Portuguese Congregation Shearith Israel, New York City, in succession to Isaac Seixas, and served the congregation thirty-eight years, successfully combating every movement to change the form of worship in his congregation.

Lyons was among those who founded The Jews' (now Mount Sinai) Hospital; he was actively concerned in founding the Jewish Board of Delegates and Hebrew Free Schools and was superintendent of the Polonies Talmud Torah School, in connection with his own congregation. For many years he was president of the Hebra Hased ve-Emet and of the Sampson Simpson Theological Fund. Lyons was an ardent student and collected a library that is now in possession of the Jewish Theological Seminary of America. In 1857, in connection with the Rabbi Dr. Abraham de Sola of Montreal, he prepared and published a Hebrew calendar covering fifty years, together with an essay on the Jewish calendar system.

Lyons died in New York City on August 12, 1877.

References

External links
Guide to the Papers of Jacques Judah Lyons (1813-1877) at the American Jewish Historical Society, New York.

1814 births
1877 deaths
American Orthodox rabbis
American people of Portuguese-Jewish descent
American people of Spanish-Jewish descent
Burials at Beth Olom Cemetery
Spanish and Portuguese Jews
Surinamese emigrants to the United States
Surinamese Jews
Surinamese people of Portuguese descent
Surinamese people of Spanish descent
Surinamese rabbis
19th-century American rabbis